A boreen or bohereen (meaning 'a little road') is a country lane, or narrow, frequently unpaved, rural road in Ireland.

"Boreen" also appears sometimes in names of minor urban roads such as Saint Mobhi Bóithrín, commonly known as Mobhi Boreen in Glasnevin, Dublin. To be considered a boreen the road or path should not be wide enough for two cars to pass and have grass growing in the middle.

The word "boreen" comes from the Irish word bóithrín, which in turn comes from bóthar. In origin, a bóthar was a cow path, a track the width of two cows, so bóithrín meant a little cow path. Bóthar was one of the five types of road identified in medieval Irish legal texts, the others being slige (on which two chariots could pass), rót (on which one chariot and two riders could pass), lámraite (a road connecting two major roads) and tógraite (a road leading to a forest or a river).

In parts of Ulster, a boreen is often called a loanin, an  Ulster Scots word.

See also
 Local roads in the Republic of Ireland
 Roads in Ireland

References

Roads in the Republic of Ireland
Roads in Northern Ireland